Universitatea may refer to:

CS Universitatea Craiova, Romanian football club
FC Universitatea Cluj, Romanian football club
 Universitatea Cluj, Romanian sports club (except football)

See also
Universitario (disambiguation)
Universidad (disambiguation)